Shenzheners is a Chinese-language collection of short stories by Xue Yiwei. Darryl Sterk translated it into English, and this translation was published by Linda Leith Publishing in 2016. Cai Gao did the illustrations. The English translation is the first ever such translation of Xue's work.

The number of short stories in this work is nine.

Background
Xue writes works aimed at Chinese citizens in Mainland China, using Chinese as a medium. As of 2016 Xue lives in Montreal.

Contents
Amy Hawkins, a freelance journalist in China, described loneliness as a common theme in the stories. One of the common points of inspiration is Dubliners. One of the stories focuses on an expatriate from Canada.

Reception
McGillis stated that the translation in the English version is "smooth".

Bailey Hu, in That's Shanghai, wrote that the work "rarely comes across as over the top".

The book won the 2013 "Most Influential Chinese Books of the Year" award.

References

External links
 Shenzheners - Linda Leith Publishing

Books about Shenzhen
Chinese short story collections
Short stories set in Guangdong
Chinese contemporary short stories